This is a list of all the United States Supreme Court cases from volume 532 of the United States Reports:

External links

2001 in United States case law